Challenger is the second album by Swiss band Knut.

Reception

Track listing
"Whacked Out" – 5:25
"Repressed" – 2:15
"El Niño" – 5:19
"Bite the Bullet" – 2:21
"Neon Guide" – 4:55
"H/Armless" – 3:51
"58.788" – 4:35
"Ice Will" – 3:02
"March" – 19:51

Personnel
Didier Séverin – vocals
Phillipe Hess – guitar
Jeremy Tavernier – bass
Roderic Mounir – drums

References

Knut (band) albums
1998 albums
Hydra Head Records albums